Coprosma lucida, commonly known in Māori as karamū, and also known as shiny karamu, is a shrub native to New Zealand. The shrub is found throughout the North and South Island.

Coprosma lucida has stipules that narrow to a small green point, while the similar C. robusta has black leaf tips.

References

Flora of New Zealand
lucida